

Northeastern University College of Science 
The Northeastern College of Science is one of the nine colleges of Northeastern University in Boston, Massachusetts. It offers Bachelor of Science (BS), Master of Science (MS) and doctoral degrees, as well as graduate certificates, in a variety of fields across physical sciences, life sciences, and mathematics that aim to provide students with a deep understanding of emerging fields such as chemical biology, cognition and neuroscience, environmental and marine science, biochemistry, bioinformatics, biotechnology, nanoscience, and network science.

Campus 
The College of Science comprises 18 buildings totalling 270,000 square feet on the Boston and Nahant campuses, with additional presence at other Northeastern locations, including the Innovation Campus at Burlington. In 2020, there was $7M+ invested this year in renovating research facilities and associated projects to create more lab space. 

Some notable buildings associated with the College of Science include the Mugar Life Sciences Building which was given in 1963 by Stephen P. Mugar in memory of his parents. The Mugar Life Sciences Building is one of the first science buildings built on the Northeastern University campus. It is occupied by biology and chemistry labs, miscellaneous support spaces, and office spaces for the College of Science, Bouvé College of Health Sciences, College of Engineering, the Division of Animal Laboratory and Medicine, and provost-managed core facilities. The four-story, 136,000 SF Mugar building was built in 1941, with two additions constructed in 1965 (South and East Wings) and 1973 (the Peabody Addition) and numerous MEP/FP upgrades and other renovations having taken place in the intervening years.

Academics 
The College of Science offers 15+ undergraduate majors, 14+ undergraduate minors, 43+ combined majors, 17+ masters and PhDs and 10+ graduate certificates.

Within the College of Science, there are 267 faculty in total. There were 28 newly hired faculty members in 2020, bringing the total faculty to 267. There are 126 tenured, 36 tenure-track, and 105 non-tenure-track, and 30 faculty members have joint appointments. In 2021, there were 3,000 undergraduate student enrollments with an average student GPA of 4.35, with a demographic of 68% female and 32% male.

Departments 
The Northeastern College of Science contains 6 departments:

Biology

Chemistry and Chemical Biology

Marine and Environmental Sciences

Mathematics

Physics

Psychology

Linguistics

Co-Op Program 
The College of Science seeks to prepare students and professionals to enter the scientific workforce serving the academic, government, or private sector. Through Northeastern's co-op program, COS students are able to develop and advance their professional skills, engage with professional contacts, and explore career options. The COS achieved 94% co-op placement in the 2020–2021 academic year, with 1,332 undergraduate and graduate students working in top healthcare institutions and clinics, biotechnology companies, and research labs. Some COS employers in 2020–2021 academic year included Dana-Farber Cancer Institute, Harvard University, Mass. Bay Brewing Company, Massachusetts General Hospital, Moderna Therapeutics, New England Aquarium, and PricewaterhouseCoopers, LLC.

Institute Affiliations 
The Northeastern College of Science is affiliated with a number of major institutes at Northeastern University which serve as hubs of research, discovery and innovation.

Network Science Institute 
The Network Science Institute (NetSI) at Northeastern University brings faculty, researchers and students from diverse disciplinary backgrounds, joined by a shared passion for networks. The institute is housed across 3 floors in the 26-story I.M. Pei building at 177 Huntington Ave in the Prudential neighborhood of Boston. The institute is made up of 80–90 active members, including faculty with academic appointments across departments, in physics, computer science, political science, business, communication, economics, and health sciences. It is a joint initiative between the College of Social Science and Humanities, the Bouvé College of Health Sciences, Khoury College of Computer Sciences, and the College of Science. The institute's research involves biological, technological, informational and social systems, and covers diverse areas, such as brain connectivity, subcellular and genomic interactions, infectious disease transmission and preparedness, infrastructural and spatial resiliency, decision making and performance of teams and large collectives, politics and voting patterns, collective action and social justice.

Chemical Imaging of Living Systems Institute 
The Chemical Imaging of Living Systems Institute is a joint initiative between the College of Engineering and College of Science. The Northeastern Institute for Chemical Imaging of Living Systems develops imaging tools to highlight chemical processes—enabling clinicians to better diagnose and treat disease. The institute primarily focus on utilising chemical-based imaging to better understand disease, faster pathways to treatment, and technologies that harness the brain-machine interface. Its researchers collaborate across six core disciplines—probe development, animal models, probe delivery, imaging technologies, embedded systems, and signal processing—to develop breakthrough imaging tools.

Coastal Sustainability Institute 

The Coastal Sustainability Institute focuses on creating cleaner, safer, smarter coastal communities. They aim to uncovering new ways to adapt to and mitigate threats at the land-sea interface, including sea-level rise and storm surge, collapsing fisheries, and coastal pollution. The Coastal Sustainability Institute faculty study critical ecosystems, working at the scientific, technological, societal, and policy levels to turn discoveries into solutions. They partner with colleagues across campus and around the world, including industry, nonprofits, and government agencies—examining not only important scientific questions, but also how the answers to those questions influence community perceptions and government policies related to protecting coastal resources. The institute's home in Nahant, Massachusetts—located just 16 miles north of Boston—offers the opportunity to study coastal habitats firsthand. This allows for access to the shoreline, a research center with state-of-the-art labs and equipment, and an extensive repository of marine species for genomic studies.

Barnett Institute of Chemical and Biological Analysis 
The Barnett Institute is a center focusing on the development and application of technologies for biopharmaceutical characterization and proteomics and systems biology, with missions to develop and apply new technologies for basic and clinical biological research, as well as characterization of protein therapeutics. The institute was established in 1973 as a center for advanced interdisciplinary research in the chemical analysis sciences at Northeastern University, in the educational hub of Boston, Massachusetts. It is housed in the Department of Chemistry & Chemical Biology in the College of Science at Northeastern.

The Institute aims to train students and visiting scientists for academic, industrial, and medical leadership through collaborating actively with industrial, regulatory, medical and communities. Today, with over 50 scientists and a $8 million endowment, the institute is recognized internationally as one of the premier centers for cutting-edge research and advanced training in analytical chemistry for biomedical applications. The Barnett Institute's close ties to the Boston medical industrial communities, along with an active program of spin-outs and licensing technology, provides for many real life applications of research advances which have led to more than 1000 published papers and 75 patents.

Research

Research Centers 
The Northeastern College of Science is associated with several research centers, which all focus on the common goal of health, sustainability and security.

Antimicrobial Discovery Center

Center for Cognitive and Brain Health

Center for Complex Network Research

Center for Drug Discovery

Center for Interdisciplinary Research on Complex Systems

Marine Science Center

Northeastern University Center for Renewable Energy Technology

Center for Translational NeuroImaging

Biopharmaceutical Analysis Training Lab

Nanomedicine Innovation Center

New England Inflammation and Tissue Protection Institute

External Collaborators 
The Northeastern College of Science has several external research partners including:

Harvard University

Tufts University

Boston University

Massachusetts Institute of Technology

Rice University

The University of Illinois

The University of California system

International collaborations include:

Tel Aviv University

The University of Cape Town

The Helmholtz Association

Le Centre National de la Recherche Scientifique

Selected Research Funded since July 2020

Biology 
Antibiotic discovery, stem cells and regeneration, movement neuroscience

Chemistry and Chemical Biology 
Theoretical and computational chemistry, drug discovery and design, ultra-high sensitivity proteomic analysis

Marine and Environmental Sciences 
Evolutionary patterns and mechanisms of trait diversification in the antarctic fishes, adaptation and resiliency of species to climate change, dynamics and impacts of plastics in our oceans

References

Northeastern University